Samuel Page Benson (November 28, 1804 – August 12, 1876) was a United States representative from Maine. He was born to Peleg and Sally Benson  in Winthrop, Massachusetts (now in Maine) on November 28, 1804. He received instruction from private teachers and attended the Monmouth Academy of Maine. He graduated from Bowdoin College in 1825. He studied law, was admitted to the bar and commenced practice in Unity.  He returned to Winthrop and practiced law until 1850.

He was a railroad builder, and was secretary of the Androscoggin & Kennebec Railroad (later the Maine Central Railroad). Benson was elected member of the Maine House of Representatives, and served in the Maine State Senate.  He was elected Maine Secretary of State in 1838 and in 1841. He was an overseer of Bowdoin College 1838–1876 and president of the board for sixteen years.  He served as chairman of the Winthop board of selectmen 1844–1848.  Benson was elected as a Whig to the (Thirty-third Congress) and as an Opposition Party member to the Thirty-fourth Congress (March 4, 1853 – March 3, 1857).  He was chairman of the Committee on Naval Affairs (Thirty-fourth Congress).

He was not a candidate for reelection in 1856. Benson  resumed the practice of law, and died in Yarmouth on August 12, 1876.  His interment in Maple Cemetery in Winthrop.

References

External links

1804 births
1876 deaths
People from Winthrop, Maine
American people of English descent
Whig Party members of the United States House of Representatives from Maine
Opposition Party members of the United States House of Representatives from Maine
Secretaries of State of Maine
People from Unity, Maine
Bowdoin College alumni